Turn Around is a 2017 Taiwanese drama film directed by Chen Ta-pu. The plot is loosely based on the true story of Wang Cheng-chung, a passionate teacher who has won multiple educational awards in Taiwan. After the 921 earthquake in 1999, Wang makes the decision to teach at a countryside school which was hit by the earthquake. Employing a creative teaching method, he is determined to reverse the perception of rural education in Taiwan. The film stars Jay Shih and Kimi Hsia.

Premise
After graduating from the National Kaohsiung Normal University, Wang Cheng-chung is assigned to teach at a school located at the rural Zhongliao in Nantou County, which is lacking in educational resources. As he is preparing for his leave at the end of his internship, he is met with the deadly 921 earthquake. Seeing the students breaking down in tears and asking for his return, Wang decides to stay with the school to improve the education of the students.

Cast
 Jay Shih as Wang Cheng-chung 	 
 Kimi Hsia as Ms. Hsiao-lun  
 Chao Shu-hai as Principal
 Lu Yi-ching as Shu-fen
 Ying Wei-min as Mr. Chiu 
 Chang Chiung-tzu as Wang Cheng-chung's mother
 Alice Chi as Wang Cheng-chung's sister
  as Temple host
 Su Pin-chieh as Ta-tzu 
 Shih Kang-chun as A-biao
 Yuan Jen-fu as A-fei
 Cindy Chi as Class monitress 
 Chiu Chia-hsin as Yen-tao

References

External links

 
 

2017 films
2010s Mandarin-language films
Taiwanese drama films
2017 drama films
2010s disaster films
Films about earthquakes
Films about teacher–student relationships
Drama films based on actual events
Films set in 1999
Films based on non-fiction books
1999 Jiji earthquake